Sally Emerson is an English novelist, anthologist and travel writer.

Education and career
Emerson was educated at Wimbledon High School and St. Anne’s College, Oxford.

Between school and university she was editorial assistant and writer on the magazine Books and Bookmen which she later went on to edit.

While at Oxford she edited Isis, won the Vogue Talent Contest for writing in 1972 and the Radio Times Young Journalist of the Year competition along with a Catherine Pakenham Award and wrote for The Times.

She worked on The Illustrated London News then became assistant editor of Plays and Players in 1976. From 1978-1985 she was editor of the literary magazine Books and Bookmen (which briefly became Book Choice then returned to the title Books and Bookmen).

In 1980 she published her first novel Second Sight. It won a Yorkshire Post Best First Novel award. In the US the title was The Second Sight of Jennifer Hamilton. Next came Listeners in 1983, the bestsellers Fire Child (1987), Separation (titled Hush Little Baby in the US) 1992 and Heat set in Washington DC in 1998.  Broken Bodies came out in 2001.

Her anthologies, collections of poetry and prose on birth, love and death are In Loving Memory: A Collection for Memorial Services, Funerals and Just Getting By (2004), Be Mine: An Anthology for Lovers, Weddings and Ever After (2007) and New Life, An Anthology for Parenthood (2009).

Her other non-fiction anthology titles include A Celebration of Babies (1986), The Kingfisher Nursery Treasury (1988),

Since 2003 she has also worked as a travel writer for the Sunday Times as well as contributing to other newspapers.

Her six novels were republished in 2017 by Quartet in its Rediscovered Classics series, with the dark love stories Fire Child and Heat coming out in March 2017 and the coming of age novel Second Sight in June 2017 along with Separation, another dark love story but with a child as the central heroine.

Her first collection of short stories Perfect: Stories of the Impossible will be published by Quadrant Books on 1 June 2022 and was included in Tatler's list of unmissable books of the Spring. 

She married Peter Stothard in 1980 and they have two children, the novelist Anna Stothard and journalist Michael Stothard, born 1983 and 1987. In the early 1980s, while transiently separated from her husband, she had an affair with writer Douglas Adams.

Books
Second Sight (1980), 
Listeners (1983), 
A Celebration of Babies: An Anthology of Poetry and Prose (ed., 1986), 
Fire Child (1987), 
Separation (1992), 
Heat (1998), 
Broken Bodies (2001), 
In Loving Memory: A Collection for Memorial Services, Funerals and Just Getting By (ed., 2004), 
New Life, An Anthology for Parenthood, 
The Kingfisher Nursery Treasury, 
Be Mine: An Anthology for Lovers, Weddings and Ever After (ed., forthcoming 2007), 
Fire Child (2017), 
Heat (2017), 
Perfect: Stories of the Impossible (2022),

References

External links
 Sally Emerson official site

Living people
English women novelists
Year of birth missing (living people)